Titirangi is a suburb of West Auckland in the Waitākere Ranges local board area of the city of Auckland in northern New Zealand. It is an affluent, residential suburb located 13 kilometres (8 miles) to the southwest of the Auckland city centre, at the southern end of the Waitākere Ranges. In the Māori language "Titirangi" means "long streaks of cloud in the sky", but this is often given as "fringe of heaven".

History

In the mid-19th century, the Manukau Harbour shoreline was primarily used for kauri logging. In December 1855, John Bishop and Thomas Canty acquired 227 acres of land from John Langford, a land dealer who acquired the area from a Crown grant. Most of the kauri forest was harvested for wood by the early settlers.

The first landowner at Titirangi was John Kelly, who bought 103 acres in 1848. Most of Titirangi and the surrounding area developed as farmland in the 1860s. For communities in the south of Titirangi, most contact to the outside world was through docks along the Manukau Harbour, which linked the settlements to the port of Onehunga. In 1902 at the suggestion of local engineer Henry Atkinson, the wooden precursor to the Upper Nihotupu Dam was constructed, to supply Auckland with a more constant water supply. Atkinson donated land at Titirangi for the project, which involved piping water from the dam to Titirangi, and then on to Auckland City. The dam finished construction in 1923.

Titirangi remained primarily farmland until the advent of World War I, when the number of farm workers in the area plummeted and native plants began to recolonise the area. The Titirangi township greatly developed in the 1910s, because of a need for the laborers working on Scenic Drive (then known as Exhibition Drive) to have lodgings. Exhibition Drive opened on 24 January 1914. In the early 20th century, Wood Bay, French Bay and other Manukau Harbour beaches became popular destinations for Aucklanders.

In 1930, the Hotel Titirangi (now known as Lopdell House) was established as a modern hotel, however the hotel faced difficulties securing a liquor license due to the prohibition of alcohol in West Auckland, and closed less than six months later.

As road access improved in the 1960s, the community became increasingly suburban. Artist Colin McCahon lived at Otitori Bay in Titirangi in the 1950s, during which he painted a number of artworks inspired by the Titirangi landscape.

Demographics

Titirangi had a population of 7,203 at the 2018 New Zealand census, an increase of 561 people (8.4%) since the 2013 census, and an increase of 828 people (13.0%) since the 2006 census. There were 2,469 households, comprising 3,570 males and 3,633 females, giving a sex ratio of 0.98 males per female, with 1,470 people (20.4%) aged under 15 years, 1,155 (16.0%) aged 15 to 29, 3,645 (50.6%) aged 30 to 64, and 933 (13.0%) aged 65 or older.

Ethnicities were 83.4% European/Pākehā, 8.0% Māori, 5.4% Pacific peoples, 12.4% Asian, and 2.9% other ethnicities. People may identify with more than one ethnicity.

The percentage of people born overseas was 30.9, compared with 27.1% nationally.

Although some people chose not to answer the census's question about religious affiliation, 56.6% had no religion, 28.8% were Christian, 0.3% had Māori religious beliefs, 2.7% were Hindu, 0.5% were Muslim, 1.2% were Buddhist and 3.0% had other religions.

Of those at least 15 years old, 2,052 (35.8%) people had a bachelor's or higher degree, and 555 (9.7%) people had no formal qualifications. 1,719 people (30.0%) earned over $70,000 compared to 17.2% nationally. The employment status of those at least 15 was that 3,150 (54.9%) people were employed full-time, 867 (15.1%) were part-time, and 213 (3.7%) were unemployed.

Geography

Titirangi is bordered to the south by Manukau Harbour, to the west and north west by the rest of the Waitākere Ranges' native bush clad hills consisting of the large Centennial Memorial Park and water catchment areas which supply much of Auckland's water. The main road into the Waitakeres, the Scenic Drive, begins in Titirangi. To the east and north are a number of more urban suburbs.

The Waitākere Ranges lie on the west coast of the North Island in the path of the prevailing winds from the Tasman and consequently attract a high rainfall. The native bush is home to many native birds, such as the fantail, tūī, kererū or "wood pigeon", morepork and white-eye, and geckos and rare native frogs. The landscape of Titirangi ranges from Titirangi Beach on the Manukau Harbour to 400 metre (1300') high parts of the Waitākere Ranges.

Mt Atkinson is in the foothills of Titirangi, not far from the village centre. In the early 20th century, this was known as Bishop's Hill. There is a short scenic walk, with expansive views of Titirangi Village and the Manukau and Waitemata harbours. There is also 'Zig Zag Track' walk, which winds its way through native bush from the village centre to Titirangi Beach. Exhibition Drive, a well-formed track very popular with walkers, joggers and cyclists, is located 1.5 km (1 mile) from the village centre.

Culture

Titirangi is characterised by houses built within the native bush of the Waitākere Ranges, sometimes with views of the Manukau Harbour. Some of the residential properties are of unusual design. For instance, some houses were raised on poles so that they could be built in the bush without harming the roots of trees surrounding the house.

The name "Titirangi" is often linked with Titirangi Golf Course. The course is actually located on the border of the nearby suburbs of New Lynn and Green Bay. Other areas surrounding Titirangi include Oratia, Nihotupu, Glen Eden, Woodlands Park, Laingholm and Waiatarua.

For a long time the area had a reputation for bohemianism. A number of well known New Zealand musicians, artists, writers and potters currently live or have lived in the area, including singer/songwriter Tim Finn (who wrote the song "I Hope I Never" there), actress Alma Evans-Freake, author Maurice Shadbolt, feminist artist Alexis Hunter, photographers Brian Brake and David Prentice, poet John Caselberg, potter Len Castle and glass artist Ann Robinson. The former house of painter Colin McCahon has been preserved as a museum and residence for artists and writers since 1998.

The sculpture on the round-about connecting Titirangi Road, Atkinson Road, Kohu Road, Scenic Drive and Huia Rd has been a symbol of Titirangi for many years, although it is a controversial presence. Designed by student artist-jeweller Lisa Higgins in 1993, it was originally erected with the intention of only being in place for five years but has remained permanently. This was part of a Waitakere City Council programme of involving artists in public developments. Its original pink colour was toned down to a teal green in 2009.

An active local theatre, cinema, community art gallery and radio station are based in historic Lopdell House. Located next door, Te Uru Waitakere Contemporary Gallery is West Auckland's regional art gallery. Many short walks or tramps in the Waitakeres start from Titirangi.

Education

The nearest state secondary schools are Green Bay High School, Kelston Boys' High School and Kelston Girls' College.

Notes

References

External links
Titirangi School website
Titirangi Theatre website
Photographs of Titirangi held in Auckland Libraries' heritage collections.
Titirangi pole house.

Suburbs of Auckland
Waitākere Ranges Local Board Area
Waitākere Ranges
Populated places around the Manukau Harbour
West Auckland, New Zealand